Wojciech Stawowy (born 28 January 1966) is a Polish football manager. From 2020 to 2021 he served as the manager of ŁKS Łódź.

References

1966 births
Living people
Polish football managers
MKS Cracovia managers
Arka Gdynia managers
Górnik Łęczna managers
GKS Katowice managers

Widzew Łódź managers
ŁKS Łódź managers